McLeod Independent School District is a public school district based in the community of McLeod, Texas (USA).

The district has three sections consisting of three wings on a single campus.

McLeod High School (Grades 9-12) 
McLeod Middle (Grades 6-8)
McLeod Elementary (Grades PK-6)

In 2009, the school district was rated "recognized" by the Texas Education Agency.

References

External links
McLeod ISD

School districts in Cass County, Texas